Lamballe station (French: Gare de Lamballe) is a railway station serving the town Lamballe, Côtes-d'Armor department, western France. It is situated on the Paris–Brest railway and the branch line to Dinan and Dol-de-Bretagne.

Services

The station is served by high speed trains to Brest, Rennes and Paris, and regional trains to Brest, Saint-Brieuc, Dol-de-Bretagne and Rennes.

See also 

 List of SNCF stations in Brittany

References

Railway stations in Côtes-d'Armor
TER Bretagne
Railway stations in France opened in 1863